Çırdak is a village in the Kurşunlu District of Çankırı Province in Turkey. Its population is 33 (2021).

References

Villages in Kurşunlu District